Krzyżowa Dolina  (German Kreuzthal) is a village in the administrative district of Gmina Ozimek, within Opole County, Opole Voivodeship, in southern Poland.

The name of the village is of Polish origin and comes from the word krzyż, which means "cross". It translates to "cross valley".

References

Villages in Opole County